Events from the year 1550 in art.

Events
 Antonis Mor is commissioned by Mary of Hungary to travel around Portugal and paint portraits of the Portuguese branch of her family.
 Giorgio Vasari publishes Le Vite de' più eccellenti pittori, scultori, ed architettori (The Lives of the Most Eminent Painters, Sculptors, and Architects) in Florence.

Paintings

 Sofonisba Anguissola – Bernardino Campi Painting Sofonisba Anguissola
 Bronzino - PortraIt of a Young Man (possibly Pierino da Vinci)
 Lucas Cranach the Elder – Self-portrait at 77
 Frans Floris – Banquet of the Gods
 Maarten van Heemskerck – Adam and Eve/Gideon and the Fleece
 Dirck Jacobsz. – Jacob Cornelisz. van Oostsanen Painting a Portrait of His Wife
 Jan Mandijn – The Temptation of St. Anthony
 Francesco de' Rossi – Portrait of a Young Man
 Titian – Venus and Musician (Venus with an Organist and a Dog, Museo del Prado)

Births
April 18 - Alessandro Pieroni, Italian mannerist painter and architect (died 1607)
date unknown
Cristoforo Augusta, Italian painter, pupil of Giovanni Battista Trotti (died 1600)
Matthijs Bril, landscape painter of frescoes who worked in Rome (died 1583)
Aert Pietersz, Dutch painter (died 1612)
Jan Sadeler I,  Flemish engraver of the Sadeler family (died 1600)
probable
Piermaria Bagnadore, Italian painter and architect of the late-Renaissance period (died 1627)
Pier Angelo Basili, Italian painter born in Gubbio (died 1604)
Pieter Bast, Dutch cartographer, engraver and draftsman (died 1605)
Giovanni Paolo Cavagna, Italian painter, active mainly in Bergamo (died 1627) 
Giovanni Battista Cremonini, Italian painter of primarily frescoes (died 1610)
Pedro de Bolduque, Spanish sculptor of Flemish origin (died 1595)
Wendel Dietterlin, German painter/architect, author of a treatise on the five orders entitled Architectura (1598) filled with Mannerist ornament (died 1599)
1548/1550: Palma il Giovane, Italian Mannerist painter from Venice (died 1628)
Marcin Kober, Polish court painter to King Stefan Batory (died 1598)
Giovanni Paolo Lolmo, Italian painter (died 1593)
Sampson Strong, Dutch-born portrait painter (died 1611)
Nicolas van Houy, Dutch Golden Age painter (died 1611)
Hendrik van Steenwijk I, Dutch painter, earliest-known painter of architectural interiors (died 1603)
Giovanni Vasanzio, Dutch-born architect, garden designer and engraver (died 1621)
(born 1550/1551) Scarsellino, Italian painter, of the School of Ferrara (died 1620)
Hans van Steenwinckel the Elder, Flemish/Danish sculptor and architect (died 1601)
Đorđe Mitrofanović, Serbian portraitist, icon painter and muralist (died 1630)

Deaths

September - Giovanni Maria Francesco Rondani, Italian painter of the Parmesan school (born 1490)
September 7 - Niccolò Tribolo, Italian Mannerist artist (born 1500)
22 November - Sebald Beham, German printmaker, engraver, designer of woodcuts, painter and miniaturist (born 1500)
October 11 - Georg Pencz, German engraver, painter and printmaker (born 1500)
December 6 - Pieter Coecke van Aelst, Flemish artist of paintings and tapestries (born 1502)
date unknown
Antonio da Trento, Italian artist especially of woodcuts (born 1508)
Antonio Fantuzzi, Italian etcher (born 1510)
Gregório Lopes, Renaissance painter from Portugal (born 1490)
Girolamo Marchesi, Italian painter (born 1471)
probable - Innocenzo di Pietro Francucci da Imola, Italian painter and draftsman (died 1494)

References

 
Years of the 16th century in art